Zex is Punk/ Metal band from Canada started in 2013. Members are Gab Hole (Bass), Mark Useless (Drums) Gretchen Steel (Vocals) and  Jo Capitalicide (Guitar). They gained International notoriety in September 2017 when a German record pressing plant accidentally pressed ZEX's music on to Beyoncé's Limited edition yellow Lemonade Euro Pressing. They have toured Canada and the Eastern US to support their albums Fight For Yourself and Uphill Battle, as well as several well reviewed singles.

Discography

Fight For Yourself (2014)
1. Fight for Yourself 2:54
2. Wild Blood 3:14
3. We're Rebels 2:18
4. Screaming At the Wall 2:31
5. XXX 2:39
6. Wanderlust 2:49
7. World of Trash 3:15
8. Break Free 2:47
9. On Our Own 3:13
10. Savage City 3:31

Uphill Battle (2017)
1. No Sanctuary 03:19 
2. Cold War 03:13 
3. Child Soldier 03:16 
4. Let Them In 02:39 
5. Burn The Flag 03:51 
6. Iron Will 02:43 
7. Murdered 03:11 
8. Steel Gates 04:18 
9. Give It All 03:30 
10. Bad Decisions 03:08

References

External links

2013 establishments in Ontario
Canadian punk rock groups
Musical groups established in 2013
Musical groups from Ottawa